The Recife Center for Advanced Studies and Systems (CESAR), is a private innovation, education and entrepreneurship center that uses knowledge about markets, people and technologies to solve complex problems, changing the lives of people and organizations. CESAR develops incremental or disruptive innovation projects, designs and implements high impact educational practices, creates new businesses and promotes entrepreneurship.

Some of CESAR's competences and practices involve Digital Transformation, new products and services Experimentation, Agile Methodologies, User experience, Consulting, Software Engineering, Ideation and Prototyping, Business Models and Business Acceleration. CESAR's educational branch, CESAR School, has trained more than 5.000 people in courses that address the new competences needed in the 21st century.

CESAR's contribution to the development of the Innovation Industry in Brazil has been widely acknowledged. It was voted one of the best companies to start a career in Brazil in 2016, and accumulates various awards in the areas of Research, Entrepreneurship and Software Services.

References

External links 
C.E.S.A.R
Porto Digital

Organizations established in 1996
Research institutes in Brazil